ECOG may refer to:

Eastern Cooperative Oncology Group
Electrocorticography (ECoG)